Marcus Ulpius Leurus was a Roman senator, who was active during the reign of Septimus Severus and Caracalla.

Life
He was suffect consul in some undetermined nundinium in their reigns. He is known entirely from inscriptions, which report little more about his cursus honorum than his consulate.

Leurus had his origins in Thessaly, then part of the province of Macedonia; his gentilicium suggests he is descended from a man who obtained Roman Citizenship in the time of Trajan. Leurus is attested as having married Flavia Habroea; John H. Oliver has traced her paternal lineage, consisting of a number of prominent men of Hypata, for three generations. Together they had a son, Marcus Ulpius Eubiotus Leurus, also a suffect consul around the year 230.

Family tree

References 

2nd-century Romans
3rd-century Romans
Year of birth uncertain
Year of death unknown
Suffect consuls of Imperial Rome
Ulpii